The Commander of the Air Force is chief of the Air Force of Zimbabwe. He commands operations, administration and logistics within the air force.

List of commanders

Rhodesian Air Force (1935–1980)

Air Force of Zimbabwe (1980–present)

References

Zimbabwe